The Old Synagogue was the largest synagogue and cultural center of the Jewish community in Dortmund, Germany. 

The synagogue was opened in 1900. With a capacity of 1,300 seats it was one of the largest Jewish houses of worship in Germany. 

After the Nazi Party gained power in 1933, the local government forced the Jewish community to sell the property and decided to demolish the synagogue. The proceeds from the sale were seized by the Nazi regime. Demolition works began a few weeks before the Kristallnacht and were finished in December 1938.

In 1958–1965 the new Opernhaus Dortmund was built on the site where the synagogue once stood. Since 1998 the forecourt is officially known as Platz der Alten Synagoge ("Place of the Old Synagogue") and a memorial stone as well as a memorial plaque was erected.

References

External links 

 Über Benno Jacob – Rabbiner in Dortmund 1906–1929 Jüdisches Leben in Europa jenseits der Metropolen 

Former synagogues in Germany
Synagogues in North Rhine-Westphalia
Demolished buildings and structures in Dortmund